Teenage Mutant Ninja Turtles is a beat 'em up video game developed and published in 2003 by Konami, based on the 2003 TV series.

Gameplay

The player can play as either Leonardo, Donatello, Michelangelo or Raphael. Each turtle has his own unique set of levels to complete. There is a story mode for one or two players, and there is also a versus mode where two players can fight head to head. In the versus mode, players can fight as all 4 turtles, Splinter, Casey Jones, Hamato Yoshi, the Turtlebot, Hun, Oroku Saki, and The Shredder. A Challenge mode is unlockable by defeating Oroku Saki with any Turtle in the Story Mode, which needs to be complete to unlock Hamato Yoshi and his dojo.

Plot
The main gameplay loosely adapts the following season one episodes: "Things Change", "A Better Mouse Trap", "Attack of the Mouser"s, "Meet Casey Jones", "Nano", "Darkness on the Edge of Town", "The Way of Invisibility", "Notes From the Underground" (Parts 1-3), and "Return to New York" (Parts 1-3), as well as a level that is not derived from the animated series at all.

Shortly after a group of mouser robots destroy the turtles' old home, they begin to look for a new home. Michelangelo eventually gets on Raphael's nerves, making Raphael leave to the surface. At the surface, he is confronted by Purple Dragon thugs, Casey Jones, and Dragonface. Baxter Stockman soon uses invisible foot tech ninjas to capture Raphael, and Donatello is forced to rescue him. Afterward, while Raphael and Michelangelo spar for fun, Donatello analyzes a strange crystal he found in their home, noting that they look like mutated brain cells. Raphael kicks Michelangelo into a wall, revealing a large tunnel behind it. Donatello's crystal start glowing and the turtles decide to investigate. They follow the tunnel and they are confronted by genetically mutated humans. After a few scuffles with these mutants, the turtles find that these mutants were turned into their current state by past experiments of Shredder's scientists. The crystals Donatello found are the only thing keeping these mutants alive, and cannot leave their underground home as a result. They plead the turtles to defeat Shredder, so that no more humans will suffer as they have. The turtles decide to defeat Shredder once and for all, and promise the mutants that they will come back for them if they ever find a way to reverse their condition.

Reception

Teenage Mutant Ninja Turtles received mostly mixed reviews among critics. While praising it for great presentation and graphics, as well as the voice acting being "spot-on", they had problems with the sound, claiming that every time a Turtles would attack, they would say the same one-liner they did the last time they attacked. Many of them also complain that the gameplay has been turned into a very simple button-masher, there are also dumb AI enemies, poor stage designs, two players instead of four, and no block move.

Sequels
The game received two sequels: Teenage Mutant Ninja Turtles 2: Battle Nexus in 2004, and Teenage Mutant Ninja Turtles 3: Mutant Nightmare in 2005.

References

External links

2003 video games
Konami beat 'em ups
PlayStation 2 games
Xbox games
GameCube games
Windows games
Video games based on Teenage Mutant Ninja Turtles
Video games developed in Japan
Cooperative video games
Video games with cel-shaded animation
Video games set in New York City